On June 18, 2020, Nick Lloyd painted the phrase "Black Lives Matter" in large bright yellow block letters on North Edison Street in Portland, Oregon's St. Johns neighborhood.

Description and history

Inspired by Washington, D.C.'s Black Lives Matter Plaza, the  mural spanned an entire block, and had "detailed historic facts about the treatment of minorities in Portland" written in smaller text within individual letters. The following text appeared within the letter "B": 

Written on the letter "A" was "1923 — This neighborhood is 100% White. Over 9,000 belong to the KKK. The state bans Japanese and Chinese immigrants from owning property". A statement about when voters changed the Constitution of Oregon to eliminate the original ban on Black residents (2001) was written on one of the "T" letters, and another letter displayed the text "In 1988, PDX banks make only 9 mortgage loans in the district from Irvington to Woodlawn."

Lloyd did not seek permission to paint the mural, and city officials did not plan to remove the artwork, as of June 25. He said of his work: 

The mural was vandalized in July 2020.

See also
 2020 in art

References

External links

 
 

2020 establishments in Oregon
2020 paintings
2020s murals
African-American history in Portland, Oregon
Black Lives Matter art
Murals in Oregon
Paintings in Portland, Oregon
St. Johns, Portland, Oregon
Vandalized works of art in Oregon